Tuğba Karademir (born on 17 March 1985) is a Turkish former competitive figure skater. She won silver medals at the 2008 International Challenge Cup and 2008 Ondrej Nepela Memorial. She qualified to the free skate at two Winter Olympics (2006 Turin and 2010 Vancouver), two World Championships (2006 Calgary, 2009 Los Angeles), and seven European Championships (2004–2010). She served as the flag-bearer for Turkey at the 2006 Winter Olympics in Turin and the 2010 Winter Olympics in Vancouver.

Personal life 
Karademir was born on 17 March 1985 in Ankara, Turkey. In Turkey, her father, Tayfun, was a restaurateur and her mother, Sabite, worked in the aerospace industry. Upon relocating to Barrie, Ontario, Canada, they initially took on extra jobs to pay for their daughter's training. While in Barrie, she was enrolled at a local public school, Allandale Heights. She speaks Turkish and English fluently. Tugba married on 14 August 2021.

Career 
Karademir started skating at the age of 5, with her kindergarten class, right after the first ice rink opened in Turkey in 1990. At eight years old she competed for the first time internationally for Turkey. In 1995, she won a gold medal at a novice competition at the Balkan Games and a silver medal in the Netherlands.

Turkey had only one ice rink then, and no professional skating coaches. In 1996 her parents decided to move the family to Canada, where she could train seriously. She began training with Robert Tebby at the Mariposa School of Skating.

At the 2006 European Championships, Karademir placed 13th. She then went on to become the first figure skater from Turkey to compete in the Olympic Winter games. She was the flag bearer for Turkey during the opening ceremony. She scored a personal best of 44.2 points in the short program. Combined with her 79.44 points in the free program, she placed 21st overall with a total of 123.64 points.

At the 2006 World Championships, Karademir placed 18th with her highest finish to date at that event. In the long program, she finished 16th, giving her the 18th overall finish.

At the 2007 European Championships she achieved a new personal best in her short program and placed 10th overall.

In June 2006, Tuğba Karademir was transferred by the Kocaeli Kağıtspor.

At the 2010 Winter Olympics she received a total score of 129.54, with 50.74 in the short program and 78.80 in the free skate.

Programs

Competitive highlights 
GP: Grand Prix

2001–02 to 2009–10

1994–95 to 2000–01

References

External links 

  
 

1985 births
Living people
Sportspeople from Ankara
Turkish expatriate sportspeople in Canada
Turkish female single skaters
Olympic figure skaters of Turkey
Figure skaters at the 2006 Winter Olympics
Figure skaters at the 2007 Winter Universiade
Figure skaters at the 2010 Winter Olympics
Kocaeli Büyükşehir Belediyesi Kağıt Spor athletes
York University alumni
Competitors at the 2009 Winter Universiade
20th-century Turkish sportswomen
21st-century Turkish sportswomen